Pulse is the eighth studio album by Front 242, released on May 6, 2003 through Metropolis Records. It was the group's first full-length studio release in ten years since 1993's 05:22:09:12 Off, marking their largest gap between albums. In 2016, a restructured version of Pulse was released under the title (Filtered) Pulse.

Content
Pulse is a blend of electronic body music and industrial music. Unusually for Front 242, the album predominantly comprises a set of suites divided into sub-tracks.

(Filtered) Pulse reissue
On June 24, 2016, a restructured, heavily shortened, and remastered version of Pulse was released under the title (Filtered) Pulse. It was released through Alfa Matrix as part of Front 242's thirty-fifth anniversary series of reissues. This release was organized by Front 242's own Daniel Bressanutti.

Critical reception

Pulse received mostly mixed reviews. John Bush of AllMusic appreciated the album, writing, "Pulse sounds like the record Front 242 wanted to make, the type they could make only once the pressure was off." Release Magazine's John Carlsson was more lukewarm, praising its technical construction but deeming it samey and unchallenging. Writing for Exclaim!, Coreen Wolanski lamented how Front 242 had fallen from being the indisputable pioneers of electronic body music to being so repetitive. Uncut magazine provided the most scathing review, writing, "Had this record been released in 1988, it would have been hailed a masterpiece. But memories of the glory days of “Headhunter” have receded, and the rest of the world has long since caught up with and overtaken Front 242."

Track listing

Personnel
All credits adapted from Pulse liner notes.

 Jean-Luc De Meyer – lead vocals
 Richard Jonckheere – percussion, backing vocals
 Daniel Bressanutti – graphic design, mixing, producing, publishing
 Patrick Codenys – mixing, producing, publishing

Chart positions

"Pulse" single

In advance of both Still & Raw and Pulse, the single "Pulse" was released through the French label XIII BIS Records.

Track listing

Personnel
All credits adapted from "Pulse" liner notes.

 Jean-Luc De Meyer – lead vocals
 Richard Jonckheere – percussion, backing vocals
 Daniel Bressanutti – graphic design, mixing, producing, publishing
 Patrick Codenys – mixing, producing, publishing

Still & Raw EP

Still & Raw is an EP by Front 242 released on April 8, 2003 through Metropolis Records. It was intended to be a preview of Pulse. Like the music on that succeeding album, Still & Raw'''s sound is calm and slow. In 2016, a compilation combining Pulse and Still & Raw was released. Matthew Jeanes of Brainwashed wrote about the EP, "Still & Raw isn't liable to turn the heads of those firmly glued to Mille Plateaux and Rephlex platters, but It's a worthwhile effort from an old standby that warrants a listen if you were a fan and at least a glimpse if you weren't."

Track listing

Personnel

All credits adapted from Still & Raw'' liner notes.

 Jean-Luc De Meyer – lead vocals
 Richard Jonckheere – percussion, backing vocals
 Daniel Bressanutti – graphic design, mixing, producing, publishing
 Patrick Codenys – mixing, producing, publishing

References

2003 albums
Front 242 albums
Metropolis Records albums